Cathayopterus is an extinct genus of ctenochasmatid pterosaur from the Early Cretaceous-age Yixian Formation of Liaoning, China. The name means "China wing", using the word "Cathay" as an old alternative name for China. The type species is C. grabaui, described in 2006 by Wang Xiaolin and Zhou Zhongh. It is a member of the Ctenochasmatidae, a clade of mostly filter feeding pterosaurs from the Jurassic and early Cretaceous.

Description 
Cathayopterus is only known from a skull preserved in dorsal view, which shows teeth splaying outwards at the tip of the rostrum, similar to Ctenochasma. The skull is incomplete, with the left side being damaged.

Classification
The cladogram below follows a phylogenetic analysis upheld by Lü and colleagues in 2016. They recovered Cathayopterus as a basal member of the family Ctenochasmatidae.

Paleobiology 
Cathayopterus was likely a filter feeder, just like other ctenochasmatid pterosaurs. It likely roamed around waterways to feed.

See also
 List of pterosaur genera
 Timeline of pterosaur research

References

Early Cretaceous pterosaurs of Asia
Ctenochasmatoids
Yixian fauna
Taxa named by Zhou Zhonghe
Fossil taxa described in 2006